Micro Gemelo Diablo I is the ring name of a Mexican Luchador enmascarado, or masked professional wrestler, currently working for the Mexican Consejo Mundial de Lucha Libre (CMLL) wrestling promotion. He is one of the competitors in CMLL's Micro-Estrella ("Micro-Star") division where he competes with and against other wrestlers with dwarfism. He performs alongside his Micro Gemelo Diablo II as part of the tag team Los Micro Gemelos Diablo. Both Micro Gemelos Diablo are also two-thirds of the trio Los Micro Malditos alongside Micro Sagrado. Micro Gemelo Diablo I is the second and current holder of the CMLL World Micro-Estrellas Championship. His real name is not a matter of public record, as is often the case with masked wrestlers in Mexico where their private lives are kept a secret from the wrestling fans.

Professional wrestling career

On October 30, 2022, Micro Gemelo Diablo I defeated Chamuel for the CMLL World Micro-Estrellas Championship.

Championships and accomplishments
Consejo Mundial de Lucha Libre
CMLL World Micro-Estrellas Championship (1 time, current)

References

External links 
 

Date of birth missing (living people)
Living people
Micro-Estrella wrestlers
Mexican male professional wrestlers
Masked wrestlers
Unidentified wrestlers